Émilie Monnet is a Canadian multidisciplinary artist and playwright. She is most noted for her theatrical piece Okinum, which won the 2021 Indigenous Voices Award for French Prose, and was shortlisted for the Governor General's Award for French-language drama at the 2021 Governor General's Awards.

She is the older sister of artist and filmmaker Caroline Monnet.

References

Living people
21st-century Canadian dramatists and playwrights
21st-century Canadian women writers
21st-century First Nations writers
Canadian women dramatists and playwrights
Canadian dramatists and playwrights in French
First Nations dramatists and playwrights
First Nations women writers
Algonquin people
Year of birth missing (living people)